Gastrotheca testudinea (common name: Espada's marsupial frog) is a species of frog in the family Hemiphractidae. It has a widespread latitudinal range along the eastern (Amazonian) slopes of the Andes of Ecuador, Peru, and Bolivia.

Despite its wide distribution, Gastrotheca testudinea is seldom collected or recorded, probably due to its arboreal habits, and much remains to be known about its distribution and natural history. Habitat loss is a threat to it.

References

Gastrotheca
Amphibians of the Andes
Amphibians of Bolivia
Amphibians of Ecuador
Amphibians of Peru
Frogs of South America
Amphibians described in 1870
Taxa named by Marcos Jiménez de la Espada
Taxonomy articles created by Polbot